Thomas Ohlsson (born 20 September 1958) is a Swedish sprint canoer who competed from the late 1970s to the mid-1980s. Competing in two Summer Olympics, he won a silver medal in the K-4 1000 m event at Los Angeles in 1984. Ohlsson's wife, Eva Karlsson, won a silver medal in the K-4 500 m event at those same games.

He also won a complete set of medals at the ICF Canoe Sprint World Championships with a gold (K-4 1000 m: 1982), a silver (K-4 500 m: 1981), and a bronze (K-4 500 m: 1982).

References

External links

1958 births
Canoeists at the 1980 Summer Olympics
Canoeists at the 1984 Summer Olympics
Living people
Olympic canoeists of Sweden
Olympic silver medalists for Sweden
Swedish male canoeists
Olympic medalists in canoeing
ICF Canoe Sprint World Championships medalists in kayak

Medalists at the 1984 Summer Olympics